Vinicius Leonel Ferreira Da Silva (born 18 April 1997), commonly known as Vinicius Leonel, is a Brazilian professional footballer who plays as a defensive midfielder for Malaysia Super League club Negeri Sembilan.

Career

Boa Esporte 

In 2021, he was sent on loan to Boa Esporte.

Nova Mutum 

After that, he signed for Nova Mutum EC.

Operário 
On 5 April 2021, he signed loan deal with Operário Várzea-Grandense from Tupynambás FC.

Negeri Sembilan 
On 21 February 2023, Vinicius Leonel joined Negeri Sembilan on a free transfer. Negeri Sembilan is the first time he has played abroad.

References

External links 
 

1997 births
Living people
Brazilian footballers
Association football midfielders
Malaysia Super League players
Negeri Sembilan FC players
Brazilian expatriate footballers
Brazilian expatriate sportspeople  in Malaysia
Expatriate footballers in Malaysia